John Stones (born 28 May 1994) is an English professional footballer who plays as a centre-back for  club Manchester City and the England national team.

Stones began his career with Barnsley, making his first-team debut in the Championship in March 2012 as a 17-year-old. He joined Premier League club Everton for around £3 million in January 2013 and amassed 95 appearances over four seasons. In August 2016, he signed for Manchester City for an initial £47.5 million with add-ons. He won the Premier League in 2018, 2019, 2021 and 2022, the EFL Cup in 2018 and 2020, and the FA Cup in 2019.

Stones made his senior debut for England in May 2014 after previously being capped by England youth teams at under-19, under-20 and under-21 levels. He was chosen in England's squads for UEFA Euro 2016, 2018 FIFA World Cup, Euro 2020, and 2022 FIFA World Cup.

Early life
Stones was born in Barnsley, South Yorkshire, to parents Janet and Peter Stones. He grew up in Thurlstone and attended Penistone Grammar School.

Stones met Millie Savage when both were aged 12. They split up in December 2018, when their daughter was 18 months old.

Club career

Barnsley
Stones came through the Barnsley youth academy to sign a professional contract in December 2011. He made his first-team debut in the Championship on 17 March 2012, in a 4–0 defeat to Reading at Oakwell, replacing Scott Wiseman after 52 minutes. He scored his only goal for Barnsley on his first start, equalising before half time in a League Cup first round match away to Rochdale on 11 August 2012, which resulted in a 4–3 victory after extra time. A week later, he made his first league start, in a 1–0 victory against Middlesbrough.

Everton

Stones signed a five-and-a-half-year contract with Everton on 31 January 2013, for a transfer fee reported to be in the region of £3 million. He was an unused substitute for three Premier League matches that season, beginning on 10 February in a 2–0 defeat to Manchester United at Old Trafford.

Stones made his debut for Everton against Stevenage in the League Cup second round on 28 August 2013, a 2–1 win after extra time at Goodison Park. He made his league debut as a late substitute for Steven Naismith in a 1–0 home win over Chelsea on 14 September 2013. He started his first Premier League game for Everton in a 1–1 draw against Stoke City at the Britannia Stadium on 1 January 2014.

On 7 August 2014, Stones signed a new five-year contract to keep him with Everton until 2019. He suffered an ankle injury against Manchester United on 5 October, ruling him out for between 10 and 14 weeks. Despite the injury, Stones was listed among the nominees for the Golden Boy 2014 Award alongside fellow Everton winger Gerard Deulofeu and fellow England internationals Calum Chambers, Luke Shaw and eventual winner Raheem Sterling.

Stones was sent off in Everton's 4–1 away win at Young Boys in the last 32 of the UEFA Europa League on 19 February 2015, for conceding a penalty kick with a foul on Guillaume Hoarau, who went on to miss the spot-kick. He scored his first goal for Everton in a 3–0 home win against Manchester United on 26 April 2015, heading in the team's second goal of the game.

In July and August 2015, Stones was reportedly the subject of three bids from Chelsea – of £20 million, £26 million and £30 million – all of which were rejected by Everton. Stones was reported to have handed in a request to leave Everton, but this was also refused. On 28 December, Stones fouled Stoke City's Marko Arnautović in added time at the end of a home match, conceding a penalty from which the same player scored the winning goal in a 4–3 victory.

Manchester City
On 9 August 2016, Manchester City completed the signing of Stones for £47.5 million on a six-year contract with a potential extra £2.5 million in add-ons, making him the world's second most expensive defender in history, behind David Luiz. The announcement followed shortly after the leaking of his arrival, having been included in City's Champions League play-off round squad registration list which UEFA had published on their website prior to confirmation of the move. Through a 15% sell-on clause, Barnsley received £6.78 million from Stones' transfer to Manchester City, an amount larger than any transfer fee they had received in their history.

Stones made his debut for City four days later as they began the new season with a 2–1 home win over Sunderland, partnering Aleksandar Kolarov in Pep Guardiola's first competitive game in charge. On 6 January 2017, he scored his first goal for the Citizens, heading the last goal of a 5–0 win over West Ham United at London Stadium in the third round of the FA Cup. He scored again on 21 February to give them the lead in a 5–3 comeback win over Monaco in the last 16 of the UEFA Champions League, but after losing the tie on away goals he spoke of his disappointment with the team's defending.

Stones was subject to criticism from the media for his performances over the season. In interviews at the end of the season, he said that he was disappointed to have not won any trophies and was keen to improve.

On 13 September 2017, Stones scored twice in a 4–0 Champions League group win away to Feyenoord, including a second-minute header that was City's fastest goal in the competition's history. He added another header on 1 November in a 4–2 win at Napoli that put his team into the last 16 with two games remaining. Seventeen days later, he withdrew after half an hour of the match away to Leicester City with a hamstring injury that ruled him out for the next six weeks. Stones suffered another injury in March 2018 while on international duty, and in April, Guardiola strongly denied press rumours that he was looking to sell the defender.

On 3 January 2019, in City's 2–1 victory over Liverpool, Stones made a crucial goal-line clearance which would end up being the decider in City's victory over Liverpool in the Premier League title race.

On 6 January 2021, Stones scored the opening goal in a 0–2 away win at Old Trafford against Manchester United in the League Cup semi-final. He was named Man of the Match and was heavily praised by manager Pep Guardiola after an impressive streak of performances alongside Ruben Dias in defence. Just one day later, Stones was announced as the Manchester City Player of the Month for December 2020. On 17 January 2021, Stones scored his first and second Premier League goals for City, coming in a 4–0 home win over Crystal Palace.

On 10 August 2021, Stones signed a new contract with City, keeping him at the club until 2026.

International career

Stones was named in manager Peter Taylor's 21-man squad for the 2013 FIFA U-20 World Cup in May 2013. He made his England U20 debut on 16 June, in a 3–0 win in a warm-up game against Uruguay. He made his under-21s debut against Scotland on 13 August 2013, playing the entire 90 minutes of a 6–0 win for England at Bramall Lane.

He was named as a standby player for England's 2014 FIFA World Cup squad, but was not included in the final squad. Stones made his England debut on 30 May in a 3–0 friendly win over Peru at Wembley, replacing Everton teammate Leighton Baines for the final 15 minutes. On 3 September 2014, Stones made his first England start in a friendly against Norway at Wembley Stadium. Five days later, in England's first match of UEFA Euro 2016 qualification, Stones made his competitive debut in a 2–0 victory away to Switzerland at St. Jakob-Park, Basel.

Stones was selected in Roy Hodgson's 23-man squad for Euro 2016 but did not play any of England's four games in the tournament.

He was named in the 23-man England squad for the 2018 World Cup. On 24 June, Stones scored his first two international goals in a 6–1 victory over Panama during their second group stage match of the tournament. He became the first Manchester City player to score for England at a World Cup finals since Trevor Francis in 1982.

At the 2019 UEFA Nations League Finals in Portugal, Stones made an error in the semi-final against the Netherlands, when he gave away possession to Memphis Depay in extra time, leading to one of the goals that defeated England 3–1. Manager Gareth Southgate dropped him from the third-place match against Switzerland, saying that Stones made his mistake because of fatigue.

Stones was named in the England squad for Euro 2020. Stones started all seven of England's games, with England finishing the tournament as runners-up and conceding only two goals, both from set pieces.

Stones was named in England's 26-man squad for the 2022 World Cup in Qatar.

Stones has been a key player for his national team in England's last three major international tournaments, forming a solid defensive partnership with Manchester United captain Harry Maguire. The two are close, having grown up together playing youth football in South Yorkshire.

Style of play
Known for his technical ability and physical presence, Stones is celebrated for being a ball-playing centre-back. Teammates and coaches have praised his composure with the ball, defensive skills, range of passing, and versatility and vision.

Joleon Lescott said of his ability: "John can do things most defenders can't – a little feign here and there, maybe a turn to get out of trouble when he needs to – and that's what is going to set him apart from others – the ability to do things others can't. He'll do his job and defend well, but there will be moments when he does something special and you'll just go 'ah, that's why he's regarded as the best.' He doesn't seem to get fazed by anything and always seems calm and he never hides". Manchester City and England teammate Kyle Walker added "You don't quite appreciate him until you are playing alongside him. He rarely gets beat, he is great on the ball and he is very calm and level-headed."

He developed his ball-playing style early in his career at Barnsley with many crediting Manchester City coach Pep Guardiola for his later development.

His range of passing has led to comparisons to Rio Ferdinand, Gerard Piqué, Jérôme Boateng, Pep Guardiola and Franz Beckenbauer.

Career statistics

Club

International

England score listed first, score column indicates score after each Stones goal

Honours
Manchester City
Premier League: 2017–18, 2018–19, 2020–21, 2021–22
FA Cup: 2018–19
EFL Cup: 2017–18, 2019–20
FA Community Shield: 2018, 2019
UEFA Champions League runner-up: 2020–21

England
UEFA European Championship runner-up: 2020
UEFA Nations League third place: 2018–19

Individual
Everton Young Player of the Season: 2014–15
PFA Premier League Team of the Year: 2020–21
ESM Team of the Year: 2020–21

References

External links

Profile at the Manchester City F.C. website
Profile at the Football Association website

1994 births
Living people
Footballers from Barnsley
English footballers
Association football defenders
Barnsley F.C. players
Everton F.C. players
Manchester City F.C. players
English Football League players
Premier League players
FA Cup Final players
England youth international footballers
England under-21 international footballers
England international footballers
UEFA Euro 2016 players
2018 FIFA World Cup players
UEFA Euro 2020 players
2022 FIFA World Cup players
People educated at Penistone Grammar School